Turovi is a village in Trnovo municipality, Istočno Sarajevo, Bosnia and Herzegovina.

References

Populated places in Trnovo, Republika Srpska
Istočno Sarajevo
Villages in Republika Srpska